Panamintaspis snowi is an extinct species of pteraspidid heterostracan agnathan which existed during the early Middle Devonian period of Death Valley, California.  Fossils are found in Late Emsian-aged marine strata of the Lost Burro Formation.  P. snowi strongly resembles Pteraspis, though while it was originally described as a member of the same family, Pteraspididae, a recent phylogenetic reassessment of the order Pteraspidiformes places P. snowi within the paraphyletic family "Protopeteraspidae," as the sister taxon of the suborder Pteraspidoidei (the super-taxon that contains Pteraspididae together with Protaspididae and Gigantaspis).

The generic name refers to the Panamint Range in Death Valley where the holotype and other specimens were found.  The specific name honors one J. C. Snow, the man who discovered the holotype.

References

Pteraspidiformes genera
Devonian jawless fish
Devonian California
Death Valley National Park
Natural history of the Mojave Desert
Panamint Range
Devonian fish of North America